William Augustus Barron (fl. 1777) was a British landscape painter.

Life
He was a pupil of William Tomkins and younger brother of Hugh Barron. 
In 1766, he gained a premium at the Society of Arts. 
He practised as a landscape painter, and also as a drawing master. 
Like his brother, he excelled as a performer upon the violin; like him, also, he reached no more than a moderate excellence in his proper profession. 
His skill upon the violin gained him an introduction to Sir Edward Walpole, who gave him a situation in the exchequer, which in 1808 he still held.

A view of Wanstead House by this artist was engraved by Picot in 1775; also after him are a set of views of castles and other subjects taken in different parts of Essex. 
In the print-room of the British Museum, there is a large pen drawing by him of Richmond Bridge in 1778.

Notes

References
Attribution
; Endnotes:
Edwards's Anecdotes of Painters, 1808
Redgrave's Dictionary

Year of birth missing
Year of death missing
British landscape painters
18th-century British people